Time in Equatorial Guinea is given by a single time zone, denoted as West Africa Time (WAT; UTC+01:00). Equatorial Guinea shares this time zone with several other countries, including fourteen in western Africa. Equatorial Guinea does not observe daylight saving time (DST).

IANA time zone database 
In the IANA time zone database, Equatorial Guinea is given one zone in the file zone.tab—Africa/Malabo. "GQ" refers to the country's ISO 3166-1 alpha-2 country code. Data for Equatorial Guinea directly from zone.tab of the IANA time zone database; columns marked with * are the columns from zone.tab itself:

See also 
Time in Africa
List of time zones by country

References

External links 
Current time in Equatorial Guinea at Time.is
Time in Equatorial Guinea at TimeAndDate.com

Time in Equatorial Guinea